is a Japanese comedy anime series produced by Jiho Eigasha. Its 260 episodes were aired from April 5, 1974, to August 13, 1975, at a length of around five minutes each.

Characters

Staff
Writers: Tetsuyoshi Ônuki, Setsuko Murayama
Character Design: Tōki Kuwashima
Key Animation: Takao Suzuki
Animation: Sumio Iwasaki, Tetsuyoshi Chyōshi, Fumio Sakai, Atsuko Nakajima
Camera: Masayuki Hattori
Animation Production: Nihon Doga
Produced by Jiho Eigasha

Episodes
The order airdates of episodes are unknown:
Protect the Oasis (オアシスを守れ Oashisu o Mamore)
Bag of Gold Coins Came (帰ってきた金貨の袋)
Gold & Dynamite (金貨とダイナマイト)

See also
Hoshi no Ko Poron

External links

1974 anime television series debuts
1975 Japanese television series endings
Comedy anime and manga